Havant Thicket Reservoir is a reservoir currently (2022) under preliminary site preparation to the north of the town of Havant in Hampshire, England. The reservoir is a joint initiative between two water companies, Portsmouth Water and Southern Water and, when completed (expected to be 2029), will span 160 hectares with an anticipated capacity of 8.7 billion litres. It will supply an average of 21 million litres of water per day and allow Southern Water to reduce the volume it extracts from the rivers Test and Itchen.

The site is bounded to the north by Havant Thicket, an area of forestry managed by Forestry England, to the east by Staunton Country Park and by the Leigh Park area of Havant to the south. It will straddle the border between Havant District and Chichester District. The site is underlain by clay, silt and sand of the London Clay Formation and, in small part, of the Lambeth Group. The current valley floor is characterised by head deposits.

References

Drinking water reservoirs in England
Reservoirs in Hampshire